Omphghent Township is located in Madison County, Illinois, in the United States. As of the 2010 census, its population was 2,381 and it contained 1,021 housing units.

History
In 1838, the township was initially named Paddock's Grove, after the first postmaster, Gaius Paddock. That was changed in 1858 to Omph-Ghent, which was the name of a local church. The name is a combination of an acronym Omph (Our Mother of Perpetual Help) plus Ghent, the city in Belgium.

Geography

Demographics

References

External links
City-data.com
Illinois State Archives

Townships in Madison County, Illinois
Townships in Illinois